Hilsa kelee, called the kelee shad, fivespot herring and the razorbelly, is a species of shad native to the coasts and estuaries of the Indian Ocean and the western Pacific, generally in tropical waters. It feeds on diatoms and dinoflagellates, and any other small plankton that it can trap in its gillrakers. Some individuals can reach 35 cm, but most are around 16.5 cm. Hilsa kelee is currently considered the only species in the genus Hilsa, although other species have been included in the genus previously.

The species is commercially fished, with 221,899 t landed in 2000, and 35,483 t landed in 2008.

References

Alosinae

Commercial fish
Fish of the Indian Ocean
Marine fauna of East Africa
Fish described in 1829
Taxa named by Georges Cuvier